Buzovets may refer to:

 In Bulgaria (Бъзовец in Cyrillic, also transliterated Bazovets):
 Buzovets, Montana Province - a village in Valchedram municipality, Montana Province
 Buzovets, Rousse Province - a village in Dve Mogili Municipality, Rousse Province